Hyères Football Club is a French association football team playing in the city of Hyères, Var. The club was founded in 1912 and played the first ever season of professional football in France in 1932–1933 but were relegated. Currently the club plays at an amateur level, in Championnat National 2, the fourth tier of French football.

History
Hyères Football Club was founded on 21 November 1911 with the separation of the football and cycling sections of Vélosport Hyerois. In September 1919 it became a member of the French Football Federation, formed earlier in the year. In 1932 president Dr Barthélemy Perruc led the club into the first season of professional football in France. They were relegated from the Division after just one year, and a year after that the club gave up their professional status.

In 1941 the club reached the semi-final of the wartime Non-occupied zone of the Coupe de France, eliminating Marseille in the quarter-final.

In 1950 the club were champions of the Championnat de France Amateur, which was the third tier of French football, and the highest level of amateur football, at the time. The club spent the next thirty years moving between this level and the regional level below. 

In 1978 the club won promotion to the newly created National Division 4, and two years later reached National Division 3 where they remained for seven seasons until relegation in 1988. They remained in National Division 4 until the FFF reorganised the leagues in 1993, when they placed in the new Championnat National 3, now the fifth tier. In 1998 they gained promotion from what was now Championnat de France Amateur 2 to Championnat de France Amateur, lasting at this level until 2003. 

In 2006 the club were promoted from the CFA2 as both champion of group D and overall champion, and in 2009 were promoted from the CFA as champions of group B. They were relegated from Championnat National in the first season and since then have remained in CFA, now called Championnat National 2.

On 2 February 2021, the club was bought by Mourad Boudjellal, after his attempt to buy Marseille and Toulon failed. A day later Nicolas Anelka became the clubs sporting director. Anelka announced his departure three months later, on 4 May 2021, with no first team game taking place during his tenure, due to the COVID-19 pandemic in France.

Current squad

Honours
Championnat de France Amateurs : 2009
Championnat de France Amateurs 2 : 1950, 2007
Champion DH Sud-Est : 1949
Champion DH Méditerranée : 1960, 1964
Runner-up DH Méditerranée : 1973, 1976

Managerial history

References

External links
 
 Blog about the team
 History

Association football clubs established in 1912
Sport in Var (department)
1912 establishments in France
Football clubs in Provence-Alpes-Côte d'Azur
Ligue 1 clubs